The Science Fiction Hall of Fame, Volume Two is an English language science fiction two-volume anthology edited by Ben Bova and published in the U.S. by Doubleday in 1973, distinguished as volumes "Two A" and "Two B". In the U.K. they were published by Gollancz as Volume Two (1973) and Volume Three (1974). The original U.S. subtitle was The Greatest Science Fiction Novellas of All Time. 

Twenty-two novellas published from 1895 to 1962 were selected by vote of the Science Fiction Writers of America, as that body had selected the contents of The Science Fiction Hall of Fame Volume One, 1929–1964, a collection of the best-regarded short stories. SFWA had been established in 1965 and that publication year defined its first annual Nebula Awards. Introducing the collected novellas, Bova wrote, "The purpose of the Science Fiction Hall of Fame anthologies is to bestow a similar recognition on stories that were published prior to 1966 [sic], and thus never had a chance to earn a Nebula."

The selection process generated both a top ten stories and a top ten authors.

Although the original publication dates ranged from 1895 to 1962, only two stories were published before 1938, "The Time Machine" by Wells (1895) and "The Machine Stops" by Forster (1909).

Theodore Sturgeon reviewed the anthology favorably, praising the decision to issue it in two volumes rather than scale back the contents. Bova's introduction thanks Doubleday science fiction editor Larry Ashmead for that.

Contents
Bova's introduction (identical in both volumes) honored 24 works by identifying two that made the cut but were not included. "A Canticle for Leibowitz" by Walter M. Miller, Jr. (1955) was not available for re-publication in 1973, for it had been incorporated in the fix-up novel A Canticle for Leibowitz (1959) that was still in print. By His Bootstraps by Robert A. Heinlein (1941) would have been a second work by that author. Those two ranked second and ninth in the voting. 

The first half, Volume Two A, includes eight of the ten leading stories by SFWA vote and the other two are not in the anthology, as described just above.

Top ten
In the selection process, SFWA members were asked to vote for ten out of the 76 stories on the ballot, selecting no more than one by any one author. In the introduction to the collection Bova reported the top ten stories and top ten authors by number of votes.  (As described above, "A Canticle for Leibowitz" and "By His Bootstraps" were not included in the collection.)

Stories 
 "Who Goes There?" (1938), John W. Campbell, Jr.
 "A Canticle for Leibowitz" (1955), Walter M. Miller, Jr.
 "With Folded Hands" (1947), Jack Williamson
 "The Time Machine" (1895), H. G. Wells
 "Baby Is Three" (1952), Theodore Sturgeon
 "Vintage Season" (1946), Henry Kuttner and C. L. Moore
 "The Marching Morons" (1951), C. M. Kornbluth
 "Universe" (1941), Robert A. Heinlein
 "By His Bootstraps" (1941), Robert A. Heinlein
 "Nerves" (1942), Lester del Rey

Authors 
 Robert A. Heinlein
 Theodore Sturgeon
 John W. Campbell, Jr.
 Walter M. Miller, Jr.
 Lester del Rey
 C. M. Kornbluth
 Jack Williamson
 H. G. Wells
 Poul Anderson
 Henry Kuttner and C. L. Moore

Select publication history 
First editions

 U.K. Volumes "Two" and "Three", Gollancz (1973, xi+422pp; 1974, xi+440pp)

Later U.S. editions have been called Volumes IIA and IIB.

Series 
In the U.K. Gollancz continued the series in 1981 with Volume Four, edited by Arthur C. Clarke, comprising an introduction by Clarke and 16 short stories, novelettes, and novellas published 1965 to 1969 (672pp).

In the U.S. Avon published identical contents in 1982 as Volume III, crediting Clarke and George W. Proctor as editors (672pp, paperback) and followed with Volume IV in 1986, edited by Terry Carr, comprising 14 works published 1970 to 1974 (xiv+434pp, paperback).

See also
 Nebula Award for Best Novella
 Nebula Award for Best Novelette
 The Science Fiction Hall of Fame, Volume One, 1929–1964

Explanatory notes

References

1973 anthologies
Doubleday (publisher) books
Science Fiction Hall of Fame 2
Works by Ben Bova